SMS Odin was the lead ship of her class of coastal defense ships (Küstenpanzerschiffe) built for the Imperial German Navy. She had one sister ship, . Odin, named for the eponymous Norse god, was built by the Kaiserliche Werft Danzig shipyard between 1893 and 1896, and was armed with a main battery of three  guns. She served in the German fleet throughout the 1890s and was rebuilt in 1901–1903. She served in the VI Battle Squadron after the outbreak of World War I in August 1914, but saw no action. Odin was demobilized in 1915 and used as a tender thereafter. After the war, she was rebuilt as a merchant ship and served in this capacity until 1935, when she was broken up for scrap.

Design

In the late 1880s, the German Kaiserliche Marine grappled with the problem of what type of capital ship to build in the face of limited naval budgets (owing to parliamentary objections to naval spending and the cost of dredging the Kaiser Wilhelm Canal). Proposals for the last four included redesigning the vessels to add another main battery gun in two-gun turrets came to nothing owing to the cost of other naval programs—most notably the s. The two  ships were ultimately built to a modified version of the Siegfried design that incorporated improvements to the armor layout and other minor changes.

Her propulsion system consisted of two vertical 3-cylinder triple-expansion steam engines. Steam for the engines was provided by four coal-fired boilers that were vented through a single funnel. Odin had a crew of 20 officers and 256 enlisted men.

The ship was armed with three  K L/35 guns mounted in three single-gun barbettes fitted with gun shields. Two were placed side by side forward, and the third was located aft of the main superstructure. They were supplied with a total of 204 rounds of ammunition. The ship was also equipped with a secondary battery of ten  SK L/30 guns in single mounts spaced along the center part of the vessel, five guns per broadside. Ägir also carried three  torpedo tubes, two in swivel mounts on the deck amidships and one in the bow, submerged below the waterline.

Modifications
Odin was heavily rebuilt in 1901–1903. The modernization work was completed by 1903, at which point she returned to active service.

Service history

Peacetime career

The ship was completed on 7 July 1896, after which sea trials commenced. Final modifications were made over the course of the following month, along with further tests, and on 14 October she was assigned to the Reserve Division of the Baltic Sea, based in Kiel. 

On 26 July 1898, Odin was recommissioned to take part in the annual fleet maneuvers; she was assigned to II Battle Squadron of the Home Fleet, which was temporarily organized for the exercises with the ships of the reserve divisions. In early December, she embarked on a training cruise to Christiana, Norway. The year 1899 followed the same pattern; she spent the first half of the year in the Reserve Division, and was assigned to II Division for the annual maneuvers. She conducted a winter training cruise to Copenhagen, Denmark, and Apenrade and Swinemünde, Germany. While cruising in the Kattegat, she came to the assistance of the Norddeutscher Lloyd steamer , which had run aground. She also helped pull free the protected cruiser , which had also grounded in the Great Belt.

In February 1900,  (Captain Lieutenant) Wilhelm Souchon briefly commanded the ship. Odin conducted wireless telegraphy experiments with the armored cruiser  on 20 March 1900. In June, she came to the assistance of the HAPAG steamer , which had grounded off Stettin. For the fleet maneuvers she returned to II Squadron, thereafter returning to the Reserve Division on 8 October; the unit was at that time relocated from Kiel to Danzig. During that period, she served as the 2nd flagship of the division. The next year, Odin spent the first half of the year conducting various training activities, including shooting practice, and an overhaul. She was present for the Kiel Week sailing regatta in June, and on 1 August, she returned to II Squadron for the annual maneuvers. Following their conclusion, she was decommissioned in Danzig on 21 September for an extensive reconstruction; she was the last member of either her class or the Siegfried class to be so modernized. The work was carried out at the  there. The modernization work was completed in 1903.

The ship was recommissioned on 2 October and assigned to II Squadron; by that time, the fleet had been reorganized as the Active Battle Fleet. She thereafter embarked on a tour with the unit that visited a number of ports in Norway and in Scotland. During the voyage, on the way to Lerwick, Scotland, Odin accidentally rammed the torpedo boat , badly damaging her. After participating in the normal training routine in 1904, which concluded with the fleet maneuvers in August and September, Odin was removed from the unit on 15 September, her place in the squadron having been taken by the new pre-dreadnought battleship . Odin was decommissioned on 10 October in Danzig and assigned to what was now the Reserve Squadron of the Baltic Sea. She was reactivated once more from July to September 1909 for the fleet maneuvers that year. During that period, KK Ernst Goette served as the ship's captain.

World War I

Following the outbreak of World War I in July 1914, Odin was recommissioned on 12 August as part of the general mobilization for war. She was assigned to VI Battle Squadron, along with her sister  and the six Siegfried-class coastal defense ships. After completing their mobilization, the unit was initially deployed to guard Germany's North Sea coast on 15 September, alternating between the mouth of the Weser river and the Jade Bay, where Wilhelmshaven, Germany's primary naval base in the North Sea, was located. The squadron remained on station until 31 August 1915, when it was disbanded, and its ships dispersed. Odin continued to patrol in the area, being assigned to the harbor defense flotilla in the mouth of the Ems river the following day.

Odin was eventually withdrawn from front line service on 9 January 1916, and was thereafter sent to Danzig, where she was decommissioned on 16 January. Her crew was transferred to other vessels and Odin was used as a barracks ship in Wilhelmshaven through to the end of the war. She initially supported the U-boats of I U-boat Flotilla until 25 July 1917, when she was transferred to III U-boat Flotilla. Following Germany's defeat in November 1918, she was used to support IV Minesweeping Flotilla during its efforts to clear the North Sea of naval mines. Odin was stricken from the naval register on 6 December 1919 and sold. In 1922, she was rebuilt as a merchant ship at the Deutsche Werke shipyard in Rüstringen. She was operated by Arnold Bernstein Co., out of Hamburg. She continued in this role until 1935, still under her original name, when she was broken up for scrap.

Footnotes

Notes

Citations

References

Further reading

 

Odin-class coastal defense ships
Ships built in Danzig
1894 ships
World War I coastal defense ships of Germany